Karl Huber was an Austrian international footballer. He played for Admira Wien as a forward early in his career alongside Erich Habitzl.

References

Year of birth missing
Year of death missing
Association football forwards
Austrian footballers
Austria international footballers
Place of birth missing